Empress Dugu or Queen Dugu personal name Dugu Banruo (536 - 14 May 558), posthumously Empress Mingjing (明敬皇后), was the wife of the Emperor Ming (Yuwen Yu) of the Xianbei-led Northern Zhou dynasty of China.

She was the eldest daughter of Dugu Xin, a major general under Yuwen Tai, Yuwen Yu's father and paramount general of Western Wei. It is not known when she married Yuwen Yu and became his duchess, although historical texts imply that it was after he became the Duke of Ningdu in 548.

In 557, after Yuwen Tai's death, his cousin Yuwen Hu, the guardian of his younger brother and Yuwen Tai's heir, Yuwen Jue, forced Emperor Gong of Western Wei to yield the throne to Yuwen Jue (Emperor Xiaomin), ending Western Wei and starting Northern Zhou.

A month later, Duchess Dugu's father Dugu Xin, then the Duke of Wei, was implicated in a plot to kill Yuwen Hu with another high-level official, Zhao Gui (趙貴), the Duke of Chu, even though he tried to stop Zhao. Zhao was executed, while Dugu Xin was relieved of his posts and subsequently forced to commit suicide.

Later in 557, Emperor Xiaomin himself plotted against Yuwen Hu, and when Yuwen Hu discovered the plot, he deposed and killed Emperor Xiaomin and declared Yuwen Yu Heavenly King.

On 22 February 558, Emperor Ming created Duchess Dugu "Heavenly Queen". About three months later, she died childless at the age of 22. Historian Bo Yang suspected she was murdered by Yuwen Hu, because her father also died at his hands, but had no solid evidence. She was buried with honors due an Empress, and when Emperor Ming himself died in 560, he was buried with her.

Popular culture
Portrayed by Ady An in The Legend of Dugu 2018 TV series.
Portrayed by Xu Xiao Han in Queen Dugu 2019 drama series.

References

Northern Zhou empresses
558 deaths
Year of birth unknown
6th-century Chinese women
6th-century Chinese people